"The Phantom of the Opera" is a song from the 1986 stage musical of the same name. It was composed by Andrew Lloyd Webber, with lyrics written by Charles Hart and Richard Stilgoe, and additional lyrics by Mike Batt. The song was originally recorded by Sarah Brightman and Steve Harley, which became a UK hit single in 1986, prior to the musical. In its theatrical debut, it was sung by Brightman and Michael Crawford in their roles as Christine Daaé and the Phantom.

Background
The song is performed in Act I after the song "Angel of Music" (The Mirror) and before "The Music of the Night" (and is reprised in Act Two at the end of the song "Notes/Twisted Every Way"). It takes place as the Phantom escorts Christine by boat to his lair beneath the Opera Garnier. It is sung as a duet by Christine and the Phantom. At the end of the song, Christine sings her highest note in the show, an E6. In different shows, Sarah Brightman sings this song in different duets with other performers, Antonio Banderas, Chris Thompson, Alessandro Safina, Mario Frangoulis, Colm Wilkinson, Anthony Warlow, John Owen-Jones, Peter Jöback and Erkan Aki.

Sarah Brightman and Steve Harley version

In January 1986, the original recording of "The Phantom of the Opera" was released as a single to promote the upcoming musical of the same name. The duet was performed by Sarah Brightman and Steve Harley. The song became a Top 10 hit in the UK, peaking at number 7 and remaining in the charts for ten weeks.

Background
In 1984, Lloyd Webber and producer Cameron Mackintosh began working on the Phantom of the Opera musical. Sarah Brightman, whom Lloyd Webber married in 1984, was set to play the heroine Christine. As development of the musical continued, Lloyd Webber decided that releasing the title track as a pop single would be a good way of promoting the upcoming musical and to "test the water" in terms of public reception. He stressed that he wanted the song to have a rock 'n' roll sound, to which producer Mike Batt added an "electro-pop beat and heavy metal guitars".

Having worked together on the 1983 single "Ballerina (Prima Donna)", Batt phoned Steve Harley with the offer of singing as the Phantom on the track, and duly suggested Harley to Lloyd Webber. Batt believed Harley's voice was just right for the song. Although he was currently working on his own solo album El Gran Senor, under a new contract with Mickie Most's label RAK, Harley "jumped at the chance" to record the song.

Harley had to audition for the recording of the song at Lloyd Webber's home. Speaking to Number One in February 1986, Harley revealed: "I don't mean to boast but after only singing one verse he told me I'd got the job!" He also commented to the Daily Star at the time: "A friend said he was going to tell Andrew that my voice was just right for the song. I thought he was joking. But I really enjoyed working with Andrew. I'd love to play the Phantom when he puts the show on stage."

Speaking of the recording of the song, Harley said: "I felt a bit like a fish out of water. Sarah would record her part perfectly then leave, and I'd have to stay until I hit those notes. It really stretched me." In the 2005 Behind the Mask documentary, Harley recalled: "I'd never done a duet. I knew Sarah could sing with an angelic soprano. I was quite happy to give it a crack, as it were."

The single was released in January 1986, and reached number 7 in the UK in early February. Despite the success of the single, the masked nature of the Phantom character (particularly in the music video) meant that Harley did not gain instant recognition for his role. He commented to the Daily Star in February 1986: "It's crazy. Here I am back in the charts and not even my nearest and dearest know it's me. But, in a way, I like my face not being seen. It's great to have fame and anonymity at the same time."

Being the prime candidate for the role of the Phantom in the musical, Harley ended up auditioning in front of the creative team and was given the role the following day. He then spent five months rehearsing, including working with producer Hal Prince. He also recorded other tracks from the musical including "The Music of the Night" and "All I Ask of You". However, days before the cast was announced to the public, Harley was surprised to be told he would be replaced by Michael Crawford.

Harley told The Stage in August 1986, "It soon became clear that the way Andrew was writing [the musical] wasn't as perfect for me as it initially appeared. I realise also that Crawford is going to put bums on seats in a way that I wouldn't be able to do at first in a theatre." For Behind the Mask, Cameron Mackintosh revealed: "[Harley] wasn't that experienced as an actor. It became obvious to me, and then I discussed it with Hal and Andrew, who also came to the same conclusion that this was a lovely impulse but not the right decision for the show."

Harley later recalled: "What happened is a mystery to me. There was no hint that they were unhappy with me, or that they were seeing anyone behind my back." Harley received £20,000 compensation after he was removed from the musical, but was given no explanation. It has been suggested that, due to suffering from polio as a child, there were doubts as to whether Harley could effectively cope with the part.

Release
The single was released by Polydor Records on 7" and 12" vinyl, as well as on CD in Japan. The single was released in the UK, Ireland, America, Canada, Australia, Japan and across Europe including Germany, France, Portugal and Spain. In the UK, a limited edition 7" release was issued in addition to the standard one. This limited edition version featured a luminous disc.

The B-Side "Overture – The Phantom of the Opera" is a two-minute instrumental version of the A-Side. It was written and produced by Andrew Lloyd Webber. On the American 7" vinyl release, the B-Side was re-titled "The Phantom of the Opera (Instrumental)". The graphic artwork and sleeve design for all versions of the single was created by Dewynters Ltd, London.

On the back sleeve of the release, a short passage reads: 

The 12" version of the single features a seven-minute extended remix of the song, as well as the standard version. Following the original mini CD release of the single in Japan, it was re-issued there again in 1992 on the same format.

Brightman and Harley's version of the song would later appear on the 1994 compilation The Very Best of Andrew Lloyd Webber, as well as on another Lloyd Webber compilation, titled Gold – The Definitive Hit Singles Collection, released in 2001.

Music video
Directed by Ken Russell, the music video for the single also acted as promotion for the upcoming musical. After the chart success of the single, Lloyd Webber wanted to further promote the musical, and the resultant video took a week to shoot. In his book Phallic Frenzy: Ken Russell and His Films, author Joseph Lanza felt the video "packs in the gist of the musical's message and story in just over four minutes." In his interview with Number One, Harley spoke of Russell, describing him as "terribly friendly, though I must admit his work does give the impression that he lives on another planet!"

The video starts with Brightman as Christine running to her dressing room. On her way there, Raoul gives her a purple flower bouquet, which she takes with her. In her dressing room, she finds a gift box from the Phantom (portrayed by Harley). She opens it and puts the veil inside on her head. Then, she enters the mirror, arriving in the Phantom's lair, with the Phantom standing across the other side of a lake. Christine crosses the lake on a boat that moves by itself. The closing segment features Christine performing on stage in front of an audience including Raoul. The Phantom, secretly spectating, cuts a rope backstage which causes the chandelier to crash on top of Raoul. The video ends with Christine screaming before blood red drips over and envelops the screen.

In the Behind the Mask documentary, Richard Stilgoe described the video as "wonderful, as over-the-top as you can get". Cameron Mackinstosh said: "Ken Russell came up with the most brilliant, outrageous video. It's fantastic fun, and completely over-the-top, which of course Andrew and I loved." Harley told the Sandwell Evening Mail in 1986: "It took us four days and nights to shoot the video, and every minute of it was torment. It was hellishly uncomfortable. I had red hot lights under my feet and my mask kept slipping off. It was like walking blindly over a bed of coals."

Critical reception
Upon its release, the Middleton Guardian described the song as "opera meets rock" and "directionless hotch-potch with practically no pop appeal". In the US, Bob Sawyer of The Valley Advocate gave the single four out of five stars. He noted Brightman's "wonderful set of pipes" and added that although Harley was "not as operatic" as Brightman, "his voice does blend nicely with hers".

Track listing
7" Single
"The Phantom of the Opera" – 4:40
"Overture – The Phantom of the Opera" – 2:10

7" Single (US release)
"The Phantom of the Opera" – 4:40
"The Phantom of the Opera (Instrumental)" – 2:10

12" Single
"The Phantom of the Opera (Extended Version)" – 7:09
"The Phantom of the Opera" – 4:40
"Overture – The Phantom of the Opera" – 2:10

12" Single (Canadian promo)
"The Phantom of the Opera (Edited Version)" – 3:44
"The Phantom of the Opera" – 4:39

CD Single (Japanese release)
"The Phantom of the Opera" – 4:44
"Overture – The Phantom of the Opera" – 2:13

Charts

Plagiarism allegations
In 1990, the songwriter Ray Repp sued Lloyd Webber, saying he had plagiarised the "Phantom of the Opera" melody from his 1978 song "Till You". Lloyd Webber denied this, saying he had taken parts from his own earlier work, "Close Every Door", and that both songs included elements of compositions by Bach, Grieg and Holst. The judge ruled in Lloyd Webber's favour in 1994.

In 1992, the former Pink Floyd songwriter Roger Waters asserted that Lloyd Webber had plagiarised "The Phantom of the Opera" from a sequence of the 1971 Pink Floyd song "Echoes". He said: "It's the same time signature – it's 12/8 – and it's the same structure and it's the same notes and it's the same everything. It probably is actionable. It really is! But I think that life's too long to bother with suing Andrew fucking Lloyd Webber."

References

Sarah Brightman songs
Songs from The Phantom of the Opera (1986 musical)
Male–female vocal duets
Songs with music by Andrew Lloyd Webber
Songs involved in plagiarism controversies
1986 songs
Polydor Records singles
Songs with lyrics by Charles Hart (lyricist)
Songs written by Mike Batt
1986 singles
Halloween songs